Penn Township is a township in north central Lancaster County, Pennsylvania, United States. The population was 10,224 at the 2020 census.

History
The Kauffman's Distillery Covered Bridge and Mount Hope Estate are listed on the National Register of Historic Places.

Geography
It is bordered to the west by the borough of Manheim. Unincorporated communities in the township include Mount Hope, Elstonville, White Oak, Penryn, Elwyn Terrace, Valley View, Fairland, Lancaster Junction, and part of Elm and Halfville.

Demographics

As of the census of 2000, there were 7,312 people, 2,606 households, and 2,024 families living in the township.  The population density was 95.3/km2 (246.8/mi2).  There were 2,671 housing units at an average density of 34.8/km2 (90.2/mi2).  The racial makeup of the township was 97.54% White, 0.83% African American, 0.15% Native American, 0.72% Asian, 0.05% Pacific Islander, 0.23% from other races, and 0.46% from two or more races. Hispanic or Latino of any race were 0.86% of the population.

There were 2,606 households, out of which 33.8% had children under the age of 18 living with them, 69.4% were married couples living together, 5.5% had a female householder with no husband present, and 22.3% were non-families. 18.5% of all households were made up of individuals, and 8.3% had someone living alone who was 65 years of age or older.  The average household size was 2.74 and the average family size was 3.14.

In the township the population was spread out, with 26.1% under the age of 18, 7.7% from 18 to 24, 27.0% from 25 to 44, 24.7% from 45 to 64, and 14.6% who were 65 years of age or older.  The median age was 38 years. For every 100 females there were 97.4 males.  For every 100 females age 18 and over, there were 95.3 males.

The median income for a household in the township was $47,205, and the median income for a family was $49,620. Males had a median income of $37,075 versus $23,795 for females. The per capita income for the township was $18,719.  About 2.2% of families and 4.4% of the population were below the poverty line, including 5.8% of those under age 18 and 1.9% of those age 65 or over.

References

External links

Populated places established in 1735
Townships in Lancaster County, Pennsylvania